Flight 902 may refer to

Aeroflot Flight 902, shot down on 30 June 1962
Korean Air Lines Flight 902, shot down on 20 April 1978

0902